Chasing Daylight is a biography and a common-sense guidebook on how to embrace death without fear or sadness by Eugene O'Kelly, who was the Ex-Chairman and former CEO of KPMG, one of the largest U.S. accounting firms.  The biography won, among other awards, the International Business Book Award from the Financial Times.  The author, Eugene O’Kelly, was the CEO and Chairman of KPMG until being diagnosed with a terminal brain tumor at 53.  He quit his job to settle his accounts with friends and family and write his book to convey how he lived the last 100 days of his life and make it the best time of his life.

American autobiographies